The 1996 Cronulla-Sutherland Sharks season was the 30th in the club's history. They competed in the ARL's 1996 Optus Cup premiership and came within one match of the grand final.

Ladder

References

Cronulla-Sutherland Sharks seasons
Cronulla-Sutherland Sharks season